Gastón Alto (born 6 July 1985) is an Argentine table tennis player. He competed in the 2020 Summer Olympics.

References

External links

1985 births
Living people
Sportspeople from Mendoza, Argentina
Table tennis players at the 2020 Summer Olympics
Argentine male table tennis players
Olympic table tennis players of Argentina
Pan American Games medalists in table tennis
Table tennis players at the 2015 Pan American Games
Table tennis players at the 2007 Pan American Games
Table tennis players at the 2011 Pan American Games
Pan American Games silver medalists for Argentina
Medalists at the 2011 Pan American Games
Medalists at the 2019 Pan American Games
Medalists at the 2007 Pan American Games
21st-century Argentine people